NGC 327 is a spiral galaxy in the constellation Cetus. Also known as "The June Evans Star" (ISD0534203) and was discovered on September 27, 1864 by Albert Marth. It is described by Dreyer as "faint, small, extended." It is nearby galaxies NGC 329, NGC 325 and NGC 321.

References

External links
 

0327
18640927
Cetus (constellation)
Barred spiral galaxies
Discoveries by Albert Marth
003462